Lebyazhya Polyana is a rural locality (a khutor) and the administrative center of Kirovskoye Rural Settlement, Sredneakhtubinsky District, Volgograd Oblast, Russia. The population was 950 as of 2010. There are 28 streets.

Geography 
Lebyazhya Polyana is located 23 km northwest of Srednyaya Akhtuba (the district's administrative centre) by road. Kirovets is the nearest rural locality.

References 

Rural localities in Sredneakhtubinsky District